Salvador Crespo Romera (born 21 October 1983 in Albacete) is a Spanish athlete specializing in the 800 metres. He has won two medal at the Ibero-American Championships.

Competition record

Personal bests
Outdoor
800 metres – 1:46.78 (Huelva 2004)
1500 metres – 3:43.69 (Bilbao 2007)
Indoor
800 metres – 1:48.80 (Valencia 2007)
1500 metres – 3:44.3 (Valencia 2006)

References
IAAF profile

1983 births
Living people
Sportspeople from Albacete
Spanish male middle-distance runners
Competitors at the 2005 Summer Universiade
Competitors at the 2007 Summer Universiade
Competitors at the 2009 Summer Universiade
21st-century Spanish people